Hohn may refer to:

People
 Annette Hohn (born 1966), German rower
 Barbara Hohn (born 1939), Austrian molecular biologist
 Bärbel Höhn (born 1952), German politician for Alliance '90/The Greens
 Bill Hohn (born 1955), baseball umpire
 Bob Hohn (born 1941), American football player
 Carola Höhn (1910–2005), German stage and movie actress
 Chris Hohn (born 1966), English hedge fund manager and philanthropist
 Donovan Hohn (born 1972), American author, essayist, and editor
 Fritz Höhn (1896–1918), German World War I fighter ace
 Hermann Hohn (1897–1968), German World War II general
 Immanuel Höhn (born 1991), German football player
 Kathryn Elizabeth Hohn (1920–2016), birth name of American actress Kathryn Adams Doty
 Mark Hohn (born 1964), Australian rugby player
 Uwe Hohn (born 1962), German athlete and coach
 Sandi A. Hohn (born 1952), Japanese singer and vocalist
 Höhn., taxonomic author abbreviation of Franz Xaver Rudolf von Höhnel (1852–1920), Austrian bryologist, mycologist, and algologist

Other uses
 Hohn, Schleswig-Holstein, a German municipality 
 Höhn, a municipality in Rhineland-Palatinate, Germany
 Hohn House, building in Ljubljana, Slovenia
 Hohn Air Base, military air base in Germany

See also 
 Hohne (disambiguation)
 Höhne (disambiguation)